The Trinidadian and Tobagonian Ambassador in Beijing is the official representative of the Government in Port of Spain to the Government of China.

List of representatives 

 China–Trinidad and Tobago relations

References 

 
China
Trinidad and Tobago